Konrad Weise (born 17 August 1951 in Greiz) is a former German football player.

Weise played his career at senior level for FC Carl Zeiss Jena (1970–1986).

On the international level he played between 1970 and 1981 for East Germany national team (86 matches/two goals), and was a participant at the 1974 FIFA World Cup.

References

External links
 
 Weltfussball 

1951 births
Living people
German footballers
East German footballers
FC Carl Zeiss Jena players
1974 FIFA World Cup players
Footballers at the 1972 Summer Olympics
Footballers at the 1976 Summer Olympics
Olympic footballers of East Germany
Olympic gold medalists for East Germany
Olympic bronze medalists for East Germany
East Germany international footballers
Olympic medalists in football
DDR-Oberliga players
Medalists at the 1976 Summer Olympics
Medalists at the 1972 Summer Olympics
Association football defenders
FSV Zwickau managers
German football managers
Sportspeople from Gera
Footballers from Thuringia
People from Bezirk Gera